The 1975–76 Sussex County Football League season was the 51st in the history of Sussex County Football League a football competition in England.

Division One

Division One featured 13 clubs which competed in the division last season, along with two new clubs, promoted from Division Two:
Burgess Hill Town
Rye United

League table

Division Two

Division Two featured ten clubs which competed in the division last season, along with three new clubs:
Hailsham Town, joined from the Southern Counties Combination League
Portfield, relegated from Division One
Sidley United, relegated from Division One

League table

References

1975-76
1975–76 in English football leagues